The Sennelager Training Area is a military training area in Germany, under the control of British Forces based in Paderborn Garrison. The area was first used for military purposes at the end of the 19th century. The Field Marshal Rommel Barracks, Augustdorf is located nearby.

Location
The land on which the training area is established falls within the boundaries of the following towns and villages: (clockwise beginning in the north): Augustdorf, Detmold, Schlangen (Lippe), Bad Lippspringe, Paderborn, Hövelhof (Paderborn district), and Schloß Holte-Stukenbrock (Gütersloh district).

History

Current and future use
The Strategic Defence and Security Review 2010 concluded that the British Forces Germany would close the Sennelager military training area, and repatriate all troops and equipment back to the United Kingdom by 2020.

In November 2021, due to increasing threats of potential hostility from Russia, the British Government updated their stance to reflect the increased level of threat.  The defence secretary announced the British Army would return to Germany to form one of three land hubs for the Army.  The British Army is to base around 250 tanks and armoured vehicles in Germany, to be ready to respond to a potential Russian invasion.

Gallery

See also
Westfalen Garrison
Barker Barracks
:Category: British Army barracks in Germany

References

Bibliography

Further reading

External links

Forces bases: Truppenübungsplatz Senne  — at Streitkraeftebasis.de, via Archive.org
Royal Air Force Sport Parachute Association - Finding A Dropzone — at RAF.MoD.uk, via Archive.org
Biologische Station Paderborner-Land – Naturschutz auf dem Truppenübungsplatz Senne  — (en) Paderborner Land Biological Station – Conservation on the Sennelager Training Area — at Biologische-Station-Paderborner-Land.de, via Archive.org
Stadt Bad Lippspringe – Sperrzeiten Truppenübungsplatz Senne  —  (en) City of Bad Lippspringe – Closing times for the Senne military training area — Bad-Lippspringe.com, via Archive.org

Military training areas in Germany
Buildings and structures in Paderborn (district)